Bothriocline is a genus of flowering plants in the aster family, Asteraceae. They are native to tropical Africa and some islands of the Indian Ocean. They are hairy annual and perennial herbs with purple or mauve flowers.

 Species

 Bothriocline aggregata  
 Bothriocline amphicoma  
 Bothriocline amplifolia 
 Bothriocline angolensis  
 Bothriocline argentea  
 Bothriocline atroviolacea
 Bothriocline attenuata 
 Bothriocline auriculata
 Bothriocline bagshawei  
 Bothriocline bampsii
 Bothriocline carrissoi
 Bothriocline concinna 
 Bothriocline congesta 
 Bothriocline cuneifolia  
 Bothriocline emilioides 
 Bothriocline ethulioides  
 Bothriocline fusca
 Bothriocline glabrescens 
 Bothriocline globosa
 Bothriocline glomerata 
 Bothriocline grandicapitulata
 Bothriocline grindeliifolia  
 Bothriocline hispida  
 Bothriocline hoyoensis
 Bothriocline huillensis  
 Bothriocline imatongensis  
 Bothriocline inyangana
 Bothriocline ituriensis  
 Bothriocline katangensis
 Bothriocline kundelungensis
 Bothriocline kungwensis  
 Bothriocline laxa
 Bothriocline leonardiana
 Bothriocline longipes
 Bothriocline madagascariensis  
 Bothriocline malaissei 
 Bothriocline marungensis  
 Bothriocline mbalensis 
 Bothriocline microcephala 
 Bothriocline milanjiensis
 Bothriocline monocephala  
 Bothriocline monticola
 Bothriocline moramballae  
 Bothriocline muschlerana 
 Bothriocline nyiruensis  
 Bothriocline nyungwensis 
 Bothriocline pauciseta  
 Bothriocline pauwelsii 
 Bothriocline pectinata  
 Bothriocline quercifolia 
 Bothriocline ripensis
 Bothriocline ruwenzoriensis
 Bothriocline schimperi
 Bothriocline sengensis
 Bothriocline shagayuensis
 Bothriocline steetziana  
 Bothriocline subcordata
 Bothriocline trifoliata  
 Bothriocline ugandensis  
 Bothriocline upembensis  
 Bothriocline virungae 
 Bothriocline wittei

References

Asteraceae genera
Vernonieae
Taxa named by Daniel Oliver
Taxa named by George Bentham